The Mirage is a late 1960s psychedelic pop band from London, England. They released seven singles in the UK.

Career
Their most notable release was their 1967 single, "The Wedding of Ramona Blair". The Mirage were under contract as house band to Dick James Publishing and backed Elton John at some of his early concerts. Bassist Dee Murray later worked Elton John's band.

Dave Hynes and Murray replaced Pete York and Eddie Hardin in The Spencer Davis Group in October 1968. Hynes and other members of the Mirage formed the Portobello Explosion. That band then changed into the equally no-commercial Jawbone.

Band members
Dee Murray - lead guitar, vocals
Pete Hynes - vocals
Ray Glynn - guitar, vocals
Pat Hynes - bass guitar
Dave Hynes - drums, vocals

Discography
Tomorrow Never Knows - The Pop Sike World of The Mirage - Singles and lost sessions 1966-1968 (Compilation album on RPM Records - RPMBC319)
"Tomorrow Never Knows" (Philips Bf 1534) 1966
"You Can't Be Serious" (Philips Bf 1534) 1966
"Go To Your Head"
"Spare A Thought For Me"
"Hold On" (Phillips Bf 1554) 1967
"Can You Hear Me" (Philips Bf 1554) 1967
"One More Time"
"That I Know"
"The Wedding Of Ramona Blair" (Philips Bf 1571) 1967
"Lazy Man" (Philips Bf 1571) 1967
"Ebaneezer Beaver"
"Mrs Busby"
"I See The Rain"
"Lonely Highway"
"Hello Enid"
"Is Anybody Home"
"What Do I Care"
"How's Your Pa"
"Lazy Man Version 2"
"See My World"
"Katherine"
"Ebaneezer Beaver"
"Go Away" (with Graham Nash)

References

External links
cherryred.co.uk : The Mirage CD
discogs.com/artist
Ever heard of "The Mirage" ?

Musical groups established in 1965
Musical groups from London
English psychedelic rock music groups
Psychedelic pop music groups